Simon Lacroix may refer to:

Simon Lacroix (actor), a Canadian film and television actor
Simon Lacroix (ice hockey), a Canadian ice hockey player and coach
Komodo, a DC Comics character